K. J. Yesudas is a multilingual singer, singing Indian classical music, devotional, light music, and film songs. His commercially published recordings span multiple genres.

Carnatic Classical Music

Gurusmarana

Gurusmarana is one of Yesudas's Carnatic classical music albums, in which he sang with his guru, Chembai Vaidyanatha Bagavathar.

There are 2 cassettes currently released – Vol 1 & 2. Album produced by BGM Tharangini.

Songs:
 Viriboni varnam (Bhairavi)
 Vathapi Ganapathim Bhaje (Hamsadhvani)
 Pavana Guru (Hamsanandi)
 Ksheera Sagara (Devagandhari)
 Siva Siva Siva (Pantuvarali)

Thodi

Raaga Series – Raagam Thodi is a Carnatic classical music album, a garland kritis presented by Dr. K. J. Yesudas.

Album begins with the kriti Swami Unnai, followed by a Muthuswami Dikshitar composition Mahaganapathim. Yesudas decorates this kriti with Kalpanaswarams and gamakas. Other Kritis are `Sarasija’ and `Dakshayani’ and album ends with an Oothukadu Venkatasubba iyer composition 'Thaye Yesoda'. The album is produced by Tarangini Music, India.

Krithis
Swami Unnei
Mahaganapathim
Yemijesina
Sarasija
Dakashayani
Thaye Yasodha

Krishna Nee Begane Baaro
Krishna Nee Begane Baaro, a recording of live performance by Gana Gandharva Yesudas in the presence of Sri Sri Sri Vishveshatheertha Swamiji of Pejavara Sri Krishna Math, Udupi in early 2002. He is accompanied by Prov. V. Praveen on Mridangam, Mahadeva Sharma on violin and T. Radhakrishna on Ghatam.

Gajavadana Beduve, Raagam : Hamsadhwani, Taalam : Aadi, Lyric : Sri Purandradasa
Krishna Nee Begane, Raagam : Yaman Kalyani, Taalam : Mishra Chapu, Lyric : Vyasatirtha
Tirupathi Venkataramana, Raagam : Keeravani, Taalam : Aadi, Lyric: Sri Purandradasa
Kotta Bhaagyave Saako, Raagam : Shanmukhapriya, Taalam : Aadi, Lyric: Vidya prasanna theertha
Nalidaade yenna Naaaliqe, Raagam : Shuddha Saveri, Taalam : Aadi, Lyric: Sri sri Ranga Viitala
Srinivasa Yennabittu, Raagam : Sriranjani, Taalam : Aadi, Lyric: Sri sri Ranga Viitala
Guruvina Gulaama, Raagam : Hamsanandi, Taalam : Aadi, Lyric: Sri Purandradasa
Jagadodhaarana, Raagam : Kāpi, Taalam : Aadi, Lyric: Sri Purandradasa

Festival Albums

Thiruvona Kaineettam
Thiruvona Kaineettam is an album of Onam festival Malayalam songs. All songs were written by Gireesh Puthenchery and the music was composed by Vidyasagar. Sujatha and Vijay Yesudas also sang in this album with Yesudas. Album released by Tharangini in 2001.

Songs
 Aaranmula Palliyodam ( Yesudas & Vijay Yesudas )
 Aaro Kamazhthivecha ( Yesudas & Sujatha )
 Chandanavala ( Sujatha & Vijay Yesudas )
 Illakkulangara ( Yesudas )
 Paraniraye ( Yesudas)
 Poomullakkodi ( Yesudas & Sujatha )
 Thevaaramuruvidum ( Yesudas )
 Villinmel ( Yesudas )

Ponnona Tharangini
Ponnona Tharangini is a musical album by Dr K J Yesudas. As the name suggests, the songs in the album were made on the basis of Onam, released by Tharangini. All songs were written by Sree Kumaran Thambi and the music was composed by Raveendran. Album released by Tharangini in 1992.

Songs
 Chingavayalkkili
 Mannin Manam
 Mudippokal Vadiyal
 Palnira Poo Ponchiri
 Pathira Maykathil
 Pookkalam Kanunna
 Thonikaranum avante pattum
 Uyarukayay

Devotional Releases

Hymns from the Rig-Veda
The Album Hymns from the Rig-Veda is one of the greatest albums of K J Yesudas. The album composed by Maestro Sri Rangasami Parthasarathy and recorded using Indian musical instruments in the background score. The Rig-Veda is the most ancient of the four Vedas and is one of the oldest texts of any Indo-European language and one of the world's oldest religious texts.

Forty minutes album consists of 1028 Hymns in 10 Mandalas. 37 slokas from Mandalas V-51-11 to 15; VII-35-1 to 13; X-63-6 to 17; X-190-1 to 3; X-191-1 to 4.

Album contained the text in Sanskrit with transliteration in English. Album released in 1979 by Oriental Records.

Music for Meditation – Gayatri Mantra
Album Music for Meditation – Gayatri Mantra was composed by Sri Rangasami Parthasarathy and sung by K J Yesudas. The Gayatri Mantra is sung in nine different ragas to symbolize the oneness of Divinity. Album released by Oriental Records.
Vocal Artist: K. J. Yesudas
Flute: Hariprasad Chaurasia
Santoor: Shivkumar Sharma
Sarod: Brij Narayan
Sitar: Janardhan Mitta
Veena & Music: R. Parthasarathy

Bhagavad-Gita – Song of God
Bhagavad-Gita – Song of God is the Sanskrit album series by Yesudas with music composed and produced by R Parthasarathy in 1977 and released by Oriental Records. The Bhagavad-Gita is as the spiritual wisdom of India.

Bhagavad-Gita, Chapter 12, 15 contains selected slokas from the chapter 12 and 15. Chapter 12 is on the Bhakti Yoga. Krishna describes the glory of devotion to God. Chapter 15 is known as Purusottama yoga. Krishna reveals the virtues, glories and transcendental characteristics of God. He explains the purpose and value of knowing about God.

Bhagavad-Gita, Chapter II – CD contains selected 38 slokas from the 72 Slokas in the Chapter II. Starting from sloka 20 which states, " The Atma is never born nor does it die", the artists recorded all the major slokas and concludes with 71 & 72 which states, " One who abandons all desires attains the state of final emancipation".

Mayilppeeli
Mayilppeeli is a Malayalam Hindu devotional album composed by K. G. Jayan in 1988. The lyrics of the songs were written by S. Ramesan Nair and sung by Dr. K. J. Yesudas. The album was produced by Yesudas' Tharangini Records. Upon release all the songs were become instant hits and still considered as evergreen classics.

Light Music

Ahimsa
Songs are
 Ahimsa
 Atta Apu
 Beauty All Around
 Circle Of Return
 Gitanjali
 Hari
 Misere Karuna
 Nirahamhara
 Sari Sari.

Sitaron Mein Tu Hi
Sitaron Mein Tu Hi is one of Yesudas's hit music albums in Hindi. Songs are written by Mehboob and the music direction by Maestro Lalit Sen. Album was released by Universal in 2000.

Songs
Chamak cham cham
Door Humse Na Tum
Dosti Hai Humne To Kiye
Ishq Mushq Na Chupte
Itna Bhi
Man Mohini
Sajni Sajni
Sanwari Saloni Us Pe
Tu Jaan Hai
Tujh Se Bichhad Ke

Film Music

Malayalam
Popular songs sung by Yesudas and composed by Baburaj are : Thamasamente Varuvaan – Bhargavi Nilayam (1964), Vellichilankayaninjumkondoru Pennu – Kaattuthulasi (1965), Nadhikalil – Anaarkali (1966), Innale Mayangumbol – Anveshichu Kandethiyilla (1967), Pranasakhi Njan Verumoru & Orupushpam Mathramen – Pareeksha (1967), Ezhuthiyatharanu Sujatha & Kalichirimaaraatha Penne;- Udhyogastha (1967), Ikkareyanente Tamasam – Karthika (1968),

Hit songs with composer Dakshinamoorthy are Swapnangale Ningal – Kavyamela (1965), Kakkathamburatti – Inapravukal (1965), Hrudaya Sarassile – Paadunna Puzha (1968), Ponveyil – Nirthasala (1972).

Songs by Yesudas with Devarajan master's music that became hits are : Ashtamudikkayalile – Manavatty (1964), Manikya Veena – Kattupookkal (1965), Kattadichu – Thulabharam (1968), Thangabhasma – Koottukudumbam (1969), Aayiram Padasarangal – Nadi (1969), Sangamam Sangamam – Triveni (1970), Omalale Kandu – Sindhoora Cheppu (1971), Chandralekha Kinnari;- C.I.D. Nazir (1971), Manushyan Mathangale Srishtichu – Achanum Bappayum (1972), Sankalppa Vrundaavanathil;- Taxi Car (1972), Indravallarippoo Choodivarum – Gandharava Kshetram (1972), Padmatheerthame Unaroo – Gayathri (1973). He sang most of his Malayalam songs in the music of Devarajan master – around 600, which is a record.

Songs with Salil Chowdhury are Neela Ponmane – Nellu (1974), Kalakalam Kayalolangal – Ee Ganam Marakkumo (1978), Madaprave Vaa – Madhanotsavam (1978), Shyamameghame Neeyen – Samayamayilla Polum (1978).

From 1980s, his hit songs are with composers such as Raveendran, Shyam, M. G. Radhakrishnan, Jerry Amaldev and Johnson. Yesudas made a lot of hit songs with Raveendran master. Ezhuswarangalum – Chiriyo chiri (1982), Kanana Poikayil Kalabham – Ariyapedatha Rahasiyam (1981), Pramadhavanam – His Highness Abdullah (1990).

Devanganagal Kayyozhinja tharakam from the film Njan Gandharvan (1991) is a popular song by composed by Johnson.

Because of his immense talent and popularity he is often preferred by music directors/producers to render the songs which require the power factor and extreme variations in ragas mainly in the big budget movies. The song 'Aadiyushassandhya' from the movie 'Pazhassi Raja' is an example for his voice clarity even at the age of 69.

His latest hits are Kadaniyum Kalchilambe {pulimurugan-2016}, Kanditum Kandittum [villain,2017] and Poyi Maranja Kalam from the movie Viswasapoorvam Mansoor for which Yesudas won the National Award for Best Male Playback Singer.wewwrw

Tamil

After Malayalam, he sang the most in Tamil. Yesudas's first song in Tamil film was in the film 
Bommai (1963) – Neeyum Bommai. 
Urimai Kural (1974) – VizhiyE kadhai ezhuthu composed by M. S. Viswanathan 
Dr. Siva (1975) – Malarae kurinji malarae )M. S. Viswanathan
Naalai Namadhe (1975) – Ennai vittal yArumillai
Vazhvu En Pakkam (1976) – Veenai pesum adhu meettum viralgalai kandu
perum pugazhum (1976) – Thaane thanakkul sirikkindraal
Idhaya malar (1976)- Chendu malli poo pol azhagiya pandhu
Neela malargal 1979 – Idhu irava pagalaa
Thrishoolam- Thirumaalin thirumarbil sreedevi mugamae
Vayasu Ponnu (1978) – Kaanchi Pattuduththi[Ilaiyaraaja]

He made lot of hit songs. Other major music directors worked with him are Ilaiyaraja, A. R. Rahman, Rajkumar S.A., S. Balachander, Vaidyanathan L., Deva, Gangai Amaran, Aadithyan, K. V. Mahadevan, Shankar–Ganesh and Vidyasagar.

He had fortune to sing songs written by Subramanya Bharathy (Yezhavuthu Manithan, 1981) and Bharati, 2000) and Kannadasan.'En Iniya Pon Nilave' – Moodu Pani,  'Poove Sempoove' – Solla Thudikkuthu manasu, 'Aarariraro' – Raam, 'Raaja Raaja Chozan' – Rettai Vaal Kuruvi, Thendral Vanthu' – Thendrale Ennai Thodu, 'Kanne Kalaimaane' & 'Poongaatru' – Moondram Pirai, 'Vaa Vaa Anbe' – Agni Natchathiram,  'Vellai Puraa' – Pudhu Kavithai are popular. He was awarded Kalaimamani Award and eight time State Award for the best playback singer from Tamil Nadu Government.

Kannada
He made lot of hit songs in Kannada films. Some hit songs are
Anuragadalil Gandharva Gana – Gandharva
Hoovina Lokha Nammadu – Kempu Gulabi
Gouria Roopa Ninamma – Madura Preethi
Anatha maguvaade – Hosa Jeevana
Preethi Mador Madhya Hogi – Mallige Hoove
Andavo Andavu Kannadanadu – Mallige Hoove
Kele Kele Bharatha Mathe – Abhimanyu
Nagumoo Mohana – Rayaru Bandaru Mavana Manege
Nammoora Yuvarani – Ramachaari
Ramachaari Haaduva – Ramachaari
Ee Yavvana Madhura – Ramarajyadhalli Raksharu
Yaakamma Beku – Sneha
Haadonda Naa Haaduvenu – Shruthi
Meru Giriyane – S. P. Sangliyana Part 2
Mane Mandi Gella – Triveni
Navarathri Nota Nayana Mohana – Shri Durgey Pooje
Sone Sone – Preethsod Thappa
Bangardinda – Preethsod Tappa
Ellellu Sangeethave – Malaya Marutha
Yaare Neenu Cheluve – Naanu Nanna Hendthi
Ninnantha Kathaikaru – Asambhava
Paaramaartha Thathwa – Ganayogi Panchakshara Gawai
Naanu Kannadada Kanda – A.K 47
Ago Bandanu – Dore
Ade Saagara – Prithviraj
Banni Kannamuche Adona – Prithviraj

Major Kannada musicians worked with him are Hamsalekha, R. Sudarsanam, S. A. Rajkumar, V.Manohar, Upendrakumar and Gurukiran. He is one of the favourite singers of ace musician and lyricist Hamsalekha. He often records songs with him, and the duo has produced a number of hit songs. He also sang for a number of devotional songs in Kannada.

Telugu 
Yesudas has been singing in both Classical and film songs in Telugu.His first song in Telugu was Oh Nindu Chandamama composed by S. P. Kodandapani for the movie Bangaru Thimmaraju (1964).
{| class="wikitable sortable"
|+
|-
! Year
!Film
!Song
!Composer(s)
!Writer(s)
!Co-artist(s)
|-
| rowspan="3" |1964
!Bangaru Thimmaraju 
|"Oh Nindu Chandamama"
|S. P. Kodandapani
|
|
|-
! rowspan="2" |Kavala Pillalu
|"Aame Baliyai"
| rowspan="2" |Viswanathan–Ramamoorthy
|
|P. B. Sreenivas
|-
|"Maa Manase"
|
|
|-
|1965
!Prachanda Bhairavi
|"Needhanara Nannelara"
|Pendyala Nageshwara Rao
|
|S. Janaki, B. Vasantha, Venkata Rao
|-
| rowspan="3" |1967
!Iddaru Monagaallu
|"Konguna Kattesukona"
|S. P. Kodandapani
|
|S. Janaki
|-
!Sri Sri Sri Maryada Ramanna
|"Vennela Undhi"
|S. P. Kodandapani
|
|P. Susheela
|-
!Sathyame Jayam
|"Nee Sogase Niganigalaadi"
|S. P. Kodandapani
|
|P. Susheela
|-
|1968
!Manchi Kutumbam
|"Preminchuta Pillala"
|S. P. Kodandapani
|
|P. Susheela, S. Janaki, Sowcar Janaki, Rallabhandi
|-
|1969
!Prathikaram
|"Stop Look And Go"
|Chellapilla Satyam
|
|S. Janaki
|-
|1970
!Marina Manishi
|"Chinnavada Velathava"
|T. V. Raju
|
|B. Vasantha
|-
| rowspan="6" |1971
! rowspan="2" |Mary Matha
|"Sagara Theera Sameepana"
| rowspan="2" |G. Devarajan
|
|
|-
|"Thana Thana Thandana"
|
|P. Madhuri
|-
! rowspan="4" |Sri Krishna Satya
|"Sri Rama Jaya Rama"
| rowspan="4" |Pendyala Nageshwara Rao
|
|
|-
|"Kasthuri Thilakam"
|
|
|-
|"Sri Raghavam"(Slokam)
|
|
|-
|"Kavvadithodi Porithamu"
|
|
|-
| rowspan="4" |1972
!Kula Gowravam
|"Thera Chaapavantidi"
|T. G. Lingappa
|
|
|-
! rowspan="3" |Prema Pakshulu
|"Aaddham Choosthe"
| rowspan="3" |Ashwathama Gudimetla
|
|
|-
|"Thellaredhaka Nuvvu"
|
|
|-
|"Visavisa Nadiche"
|
|
|-
|1973
!Nenu Naa Desham
|"Kurisenu Hrudayamulo"
|Chellapilla Satyam
|
|P. Susheela
|-
| rowspan="5" |1975
! rowspan="2" |Miss Julie Prema Katha
|"Julie Yes Darling"
| rowspan="2" |Chellapilla Satyam
|
|P. Madhuri
|-
|"Vennela"
|
|
|-
! rowspan="3" |Swamy Ayyappa
|"Jagamula Netha"
| rowspan="3" |G. Devarajan
|
|
|-
|"Harivarasanam Viswamohanam"
|
|
|-
|"Sabarimalanu Swarna"
|
|
|-
|1976
!Anthuleni Katha
|"Devude Ichadu"
|M. S. Viswanathan
|
|
|-
| rowspan="2" |1977
!Bhadrakali
|"Chinni Chinni Kannayya"
|Ilaiyaraaja
|
|P. Susheela
|-
!Tholireyi Gadichindi
|"Jabilli Merisele"
|Chellapilla Satyam
|
|P. Susheela
|-
| rowspan="2" |1979
!Dasha Thirigindhi
|"Andhala Naa Krishnaveni"
|Chellapilla Satyam
|
|
|-
!Rama Banam
|"Amma Premaku"(Sad)
|Chellapilla Satyam
|
|
|-
| rowspan="2" |1980
! rowspan="2" |Sivamethina Sathyam
|"Neevu Naa Pakkanunte"
| rowspan="2" |J. V. Raghavulu
|
| rowspan="2" |Vani Jairam
|-
|"Geetha O Geetha"
|
|-
| rowspan="3" |1981
!Dhaari Thappina Manishi
|"Vu Anna Aa Anna"
|Vijaya Bhaskar
|
|P. Susheela
|-
!Illaalu
|"Oh Baatasaari"
|K. Chakravarthy
|
|S. P. Sailaja
|-
!Jegantalu
|"Evaramma Evaramma"
|K. V. Mahadevan
|
|Vani Jairam
|-
| rowspan="15" |1982
!Golconda Abbulu
|"Twinkle Twinkle"
|K. V. Mahadevan
|
|
|-
!Gruhapravesham
|"Dhaari Choopina Devatha"
|Chellapilla Satyam
|
|
|-
! rowspan="8" |Meghasandesam
|"Sigalo Avi Virulo"
| rowspan="8" |Ramesh Naidu
|
|
|-
|"Seetha Vela Raaneeyaku"
|
|P. Susheela
|-
|"Navarasa Sumamalika"
|
|
|-
|"Priye Chaarusheele"
|
|P. Susheela
|-
|"Radhika Krishna"
|
|P. Susheela
|-
|"Aakaasha Deshaana"
|
|
|-
|"Navarasa Sumamalika"(Bit)
|
|
|-
|"Poems"
|
|
|-
! rowspan="3" |Mettela Savvadi
|"Yedhi Aa Nadham Yemaipoyindho"
| rowspan="3" |Ilaiyaraaja
|
|S. Janaki
|-
|"Jeevithame Andhala"
|
|S. Janaki
|-
|"Saage Padhamu"
|
|
|-
!Swayamvaram
|"Gaali Vaanalo"
|Chellapilla Satyam
|
|
|-
!Yamakinkarudu
|"Kantiki Nuvve Deepam"
|Chandrashekar
|
|P. Susheela, S. P. Balasubrahmanyam
|-
| rowspan="3" |1983
!Dharmaatmudu
|"Thaka Dhimi"
|Chellapilla Satyam
|
|
|-
!Kalyana Veena
|"Veguchukka Molichindi"
|Chellapilla Satyam
|
|
|-
!Rudrakaali
|"Oka Kavi Ninu Kani"
|Chellapilla Satyam
|
|S. Janaki
|-
| rowspan="10" |1984
! rowspan="2" |Chadarangam
|"Mabbu Musurukuntondi"
| rowspan="2" |J. V. Raghavulu
|
|P. Susheela
|-
|"Oke Muddu Chaalu"
|
|P. Susheela
|-
! rowspan="2" |Ee Tharam Illalu
|"Sirimalle Poola"
| rowspan="2" |Ilaiyaraaja
|
|P. Susheela
|-
|"Raagam Madhuram"
|
|P. Susheela
|-
!Memu Meelanti Manushulame
|"Devudunnado Ledo"
|Krishna Prasad
|
|
|-
!Priyamaina Rajinikanth
|"Muddabanthi Kulikeve"
|Ilaiyaraaja
|
|
|-
! rowspan="4" |Sahasame Jeevitham
|"Sagaali Mana Yathra"
| rowspan="4" |Ilaiyaraaja
|
|
|-
|"Prema Nidhiki Viralamu"
|
|
|-
|"Mabbulo Chandamama"
|
|
|-
|"Breake Vesthe"
|
|S. Janaki
|-
| rowspan="25" |1985
!Andharikante Monagadu
|"Kantiki Kunuke"
|K. V. Mahadevan
|
|Ramesh Naidu, S. P. Balasubrahmanyam
|-
! rowspan="3" |Brahmamudi
|"Evaru Pettaro"
| rowspan="3" |Chandrashekar
|
|P. Susheela
|-
|"Rajani Rajani"
|
|Lalitha Sagari
|-
|"Prema Annadi"
|
|
|-
!Edadugula Bandham
|"Endhuku Endhuku"
|Shankar–Ganesh
|
|
|-
! rowspan="2" |Kalyana Thilakam
|"Sapametho Veruchese"
| rowspan="2" |J. V. Raghavulu
|
|
|-
|"Amma Neeku Nuvve"
|
|S. P. Sailaja
|-
!Kutumba Bandham
|"Ye Kanuka Iyyagalanu"
|Chellapilla Satyam
|
|
|-
! rowspan="2" |Maha Manishi
|"Choopulu Choopulu"
| rowspan="2" |J. V. Raghavulu
|
|P. Susheela
|-
|"Evaru Nenu Evaru Nenu"
|
|P. Susheela
|-
! rowspan="4" |Pachani Kapuram
|"Kotthagaa Mathugaa"
| rowspan="4" |K. Chakravarthy
|
|
|-
|"Vennelainaa"(Male)
|
|
|-
|"Naa Prema Raagam"
|
|
|-
|"Vennelainaa"(Duet)
|
|
|-
!Siksha
|"Vidhi Pagalesina"
|K. V. Mahadevan
|
|
|-
! rowspan="7" |Sindhu Bhairavi
|"Mahaganapathim"
| rowspan="7" |Ilaiyaraaja
|
|
|-
|"Mari Mari"
|
|
|-
|"Poomalaga Vadanuga"
|
|
|-
|"Rasamanjari"
|
|
|-
|"Moham Annudu"
|
|
|-
|"Nee Kudithi"
|
|
|-
|"Nee Dayaradha"
|
|
|-
! rowspan="3" |Sri Mantralaya Raghavendra Swamy Mahathyam
|"Aadave Lalana"
| rowspan="3" |Ilaiyaraaja
|
|
|-
|"Rama Namamu Vedame"
|
|Vani Jairam, Seenukutti
|-
|"Kadhalia Raa Madhava"
|
|Madhavapeddi Satyam
|-
| rowspan="19" |1986
!Aadi Dampatulu
|"Kadalinigani"
|Chellapilla Satyam
|
|P. Susheela
|-
! rowspan="2" |Eenati O Ammayi
|"Mogala Shahajadiva"
| rowspan="2" |V Shiva Reddy
|
|P. Susheela
|-
|"Nannu Ardham Chesuko"
|
|Radhika
|-
!Jayam Manade
|"Rani Vaasala O Rama"
|K. Chakravarthy
|
|P. Susheela
|-
!Jeevana Poratam
|"Marachipo Nesthama"
|K. Chakravarthy
|
|
|-
! rowspan="3" |Neti Yugadharmam
|"Veena Palukadha"
| rowspan="3" |J. V. Raghavulu
|
|P. Susheela
|-
|"Shramikulaara"
|
|P. Susheela
|-
|"Veena Palukadha"(Pathos)
|
|P. Susheela
|-
!Nireekshana
|"Chukkalle Thochave"
|Ilaiyaraaja
|
|
|-
! rowspan="3" |Sri Shirdi Saibaba Mahathyam
|"Hey Pandu Ranga"
| rowspan="3" |Ilaiyaraaja
|
|
|-
|"Maa Papaalu Tholagainchu"
|
|
|-
|"Slokams"
|
|
|-
! rowspan="4" |Tandra Paparayudu
|"Abhinandhana Mandhara"
| rowspan="4" |Saluri Rajeshwara Rao
|
|P. Susheela
|-
|"Athipragalbha"
|
|
|-
|"Lalitha Pulakantha"
|
|P. Susheela
|-
|"Malle Kanna Thellana"
|
|
|-
!Ugra Narasimham
|"Veyi Kannulu Eduru"
|Chellapilla Satyam
|
|P. Susheela
|-
!Veta
|"O Ledi Koona"
|K. Chakravarthy
|
|
|-
!Vikram|"O Kalama"
|K. Chakravarthy
|
|
|-
| rowspan="9" |1987
!Aatma Bandhuvulu|"Nee Kannula Needalo"
|Chandrashekar
|
|P. Susheela
|-
!Chinnari Devatha|"Maa Inti Pere Anuragam"
|K. Chakravarthy
|
|Lalitha Sagari
|-
!Garjinchina Ganga|"Thalukuloluku"
|Ilaiyaraaja
|
|S. Janaki
|-
! rowspan="2" |Kaala Rathri
|"Jeevana Sangeetham"
| rowspan="2" |Reghu Kumar
|
|
|-
|"Sugandha Kusumam"
|
|
|-
!Muddayi|"Devalayaanne Vidanaade"
|K. Chakravarthy
|
|P. Susheela
|-
!Sankeertana|"Ye Naavade Theeramo"
|Ilaiyaraaja
|
|
|-
!Srimathi Oka Bahumathi|"Ningini Vidichina"
|Shankar–Ganesh
|
|
|-
!Sruthilayalu|"Thelavaradhemo"(Male)
|K. V. Mahadevan
|
|
|-
| rowspan="13" |1988
!Aalochinchandi|"Nirudhyoga Uppenalo"
|Chellapilla Satyam
|
|
|-
!Asthulu Anthasthulu|"Midisipade Deepalivi"
|Ilaiyaraaja
|
|
|-
!Indradhanusu|"Katha Yedhaina"
|Raj–Koti
|
|
|-
!Jeevana Jyothi
|"Neeve Amma Jyothi"
|Raj–Koti
|
|
|-
!Kanchana Seetha|"Kaalama Saagaku"
|Chellapilla Satyam
|
|S. Janaki
|-
! rowspan="2" |Menamama|"Aasharepe"
| rowspan="2" |Ilaiyaraaja
|
|Vani Jairam
|-
|"Palletoollu"
|
|
|-
! rowspan="4" |Rudraveena
|"Lalitha Priya"
| rowspan="4" |Ilaiyaraaja
|
|K. S. Chithra
|-
|"Thulasi Dhalamulache"
|
|
|-
|"Neethone"
|
|
|-
|"Maanava Deva"
|
|
|-
! rowspan="2" |Saagara Geetham
|"Oh Vennela"
| rowspan="2" |Ilaiyaraaja
|
|
|-
|"Vinave Vinave Thudhiswasa"
|
|K. S. Chithra
|-
| rowspan="4" |1989
!Laila|"Laila O Laila"
|M. S. Viswanathan
|
|
|-
!Praja Theerpu|"Palikenu Naalona Mohana"
|K. Chakravarthy
|
|P. Susheela
|-
!Rowdy Mogudu
|"Andhaala Nelabaala"
|Vijay anand
|
|K. S. Chithra
|-
!Sreerama Chandrudu|"Manmadha Baanam"
|Chellapilla Satyam
|
|P. Susheela, S. P. Balasubrahmanyam
|-
| rowspan="15" |1990
!Abhisarika|"Aagaka Manasaagaka"
|Vasu Rao
|
|
|-
!Adavilo Anveshana
|"Ammanu Namminacho"
|M. S. Viswanathan
|
|
|-
! rowspan="3" |Ayyappa Swamy Janma Rahashyam|"Lokaveram"(Slokam)
| rowspan="3" |K. V. Mahadevan
|
|
|-
|"Swami Ayyappa"
|
|
|-
|"Harivaraasanam"
|
|
|-
! rowspan="3" |Alludugaru|"Kondalalo Nelakonna"
| rowspan="3" |K. V. Mahadevan
|
|K. S. Chithra
|-
|"Muddabanthi Puvvulo"
|
|K. S. Chithra
|-
|"Nagumomu Ganaleni"
|
|
|-
!Ghatana|"Vidhi Chethilo Bommalu"
|Manoj–Gyan
|
|
|-
!Intinti Deepavali|"Madhuram Madhuram"
|Siva Shankar
|
|K. S. Chithra
|-
! rowspan="2" |Maa Inti Katha|"Koyila Koyila Koyilammalo"
| rowspan="2" |K. Chakravarthy
|
|K. S. Chithra
|-
|"Idhena Runanu Bandham"
|
|
|-
! rowspan="2" |O Papa Lali
|"Neevega Naa Pranam"
| rowspan="2" |Ilaiyaraaja
|
|K. S. Chithra
|-
|"Segali Sandhela"
|
|K. S. Chithra
|-
!Udhyamam|"Swagatham Suswagatham"
|Raj–Koti
|
|K. S. Chithra
|-
| rowspan="12" |1991
!Amma Rajinama|"Srustikartha Oka Brahma"
|K. Chakravarthy
|
|
|-
!Assembly Rowdy|"Andhamaina Vennelalona"
|K. V. Mahadevan
|
|K. S. Chithra
|-
! rowspan="3" |Brahmarshi Viswamitra|"Priya Cheliya"
| rowspan="3" |Ravindra Jain
|
|P. Susheela
|-
|"Ganga Taranga"
|
|
|-
|"Kaushalya Suprajarama"
|
|
|-
!Dalapathi|"Singarala"
|Ilaiyaraaja
|
|S. P. Balasubrahmanyam
|-
!Manjeera Nadham|"Aagiponi Neeke"
|K. V. Mahadevan
|
|
|-
!Minor Raja|"Nadi Veedhilo Amma"
|Vidyasagar
|
|K. S. Chithra
|-
! rowspan="3" |Rowdy Gaari Pellam|"Kunti Kumari"
| rowspan="3" |Bappi Lahiri
|
|
|-
|"Boyavani Vetuku"
|
|
|-
|"Theeripoye"(Bit)
|
|
|-
!Vidhatha|"Chiranjeevi Maa Nanna Pelliki"
|Shyam
|
|K. S. Chithra, Mano
|-
| rowspan="7" |1992
! rowspan="2" |Brahma|"Chumma Chumma"
| rowspan="2" |Bappi Lahiri
|
|K. S. Chithra
|-
|"Musi Musi Navvulalona"
|
|
|-
!Donga Police|"Aa Poola Rangu Naa Cheera"
|Bappi Lahiri
|
|K. S. Chithra
|-
!Gang War|"Valapukidhe"
|Raj–Koti
|
|Swarnalatha
|-
!Pattudhala|"Yeppudu Voppukovaddura"
|Ilaiyaraaja
|
|
|-
! rowspan="2" |Peddarikam|"Idhele Tharatharala"(Solo)
| rowspan="2" |Raj–Koti
|
|
|-
|"Idhele Tharatharala"(Duet)
|
|Swarnalatha
|-
| rowspan="12" |1993
!Anna Vadhina|"Penchukunna Malletheega"
|M. S. Viswanathan
|
|K. S. Chithra
|-
! rowspan="2" |Chittemma Mogudu|"Chinuku Raalithe"
| rowspan="2" |K. V. Mahadevan
|
|K. S. Chithra
|-
|"Nindu Kundala"
|
|
|-
!Director Gari Pellam
|"Idhe Nizam"
|Ilaiyaraaja
|
|
|-
!Kaliyugam|"Bantureethi Koluvu"
|Mohan Sithara
|
|
|-
! rowspan="2" |Kunthi Puthrudu|"Oka Hrudayam Palikina"
| rowspan="2" |Ilaiyaraaja
|
|
|-
|"Gummali Thommidhi"(Male)
|
|
|-
!Major Chandrakanth
|"Muddultho Onamaalu"
|M. M. Keeravani
|
|K. S. Chithra
|-
!Naga Jyothi|"Nee Nosata Kumkuma"
|Vidyasagar
|
|K. S. Chithra
|-
! rowspan="3" |Sarigamalu|"Krishna kripa Saagaram"
| rowspan="3" |Bombay Ravi
|
|K. S. Chithra
|-
|"Swararaga Ganga"
|
|
|-
|"Raagasudharasa"
|
|K. S. Chithra
|-
| rowspan="4" |1994
!Allari Police|"Anaganaga"
|Ilaiyaraaja
|
|
|-
!Neram|"Veyra Mundadugu"
|Naveen - Jyothi
|
|
|-
!Palnati Pourusham|"Neeli Mabbu Kondallona"
|A. R. Rahman
|
|K. S. Chithra
|-
!President Gari Alludu|"Kommadige Remmadige"
|Madhavapeddi Suresh
|
|K. S. Chithra, S. Janaki
|-
| rowspan="4" |1995
!Ammaleni Puttillu|"Chedirina Nee Kumkumale"
|Vandemataram Srinivas
|
|
|-
!Amma Naa Kodala|"Ye Nyayasthanam"
|Vandemataram Srinivas
|
|
|-
!Pedarayudu 
|"Kadile kalama"
|Koti
|
|K. S. Chithra
|-
!Sogasu Chooda Tarama
|"Sogasu Chooda Tarama"
|Bharadwaj
|
|
|-
| rowspan="11" |1996
!Amma Nanna Kaavali|"Kathaga Migilinda"
|Vandemataram Srinivas
|
|
|-
! rowspan="2" |Aranyam|"Jo Laali Jo Laali"(Happy)
| rowspan="2" |Vandemataram Srinivas
|
|
|-
|"Jo Laali Jo Laali"(Sad)
|
|
|-
!Bala Ramayanam
|"Andabayani Jantaga"
|Madhavapeddi Suresh
|
|K. S. Chithra
|-
!Bharateeyudu
|"Pachani Chilukalu"
|A. R. Rahman
|
|
|-
!Neti Savithri
|"Evare Kannavaru"
|Devendran
|
|
|-
!Pavitra Bandham|"Apuroopam"
|M. M. Keeravani
|
|
|-
! rowspan="2" |Soggadi Pellam|"Konda Kona"
| rowspan="2" |Koti
|
|K. S. Chithra
|-
|"Konda Kona"(Pathos)
|
|
|-
! rowspan="2" |Srikaram|"Manasu Kastha"
| rowspan="2" |Ilaiyaraaja
|
|
|-
|"Nithyam Raguluthunna"
|
|
|-
| rowspan="13" |1997
! rowspan="3" |Adavilo Anna|"Addhala Medaku"
| rowspan="3" |Vandemataram Srinivas
|
|Swarnalatha
|-
|"Vellipoyava Amma"
|
|
|-
|"Vandhanalamma"
|
|S. Janaki
|-
!Bobbili Dora|"Bommalenni Chesina"
|Koti
|
|
|-
! rowspan="2" |Collector Garu|"Entha Manchivadavayya"
| rowspan="2" |Koti
|
|K. S. Chithra
|-
|"Janma Ichinandhuku"
|
|
|-
!Evandi Pelli Chesukondi|"Nee Nosatana Kumkuma"
|Koti
|
|
|-
!Hitler
|"O Kaalama"
|Koti
|
|
|-
!Maa Aayana Bangaram|"Chitti Koona"(Sad)
|Vandemataram Srinivas
|
|
|-
!Pelli|"Anuraagame Mantramga"
|S. A. Rajkumar
|
|
|-
!Pelli Chesukundam|"Nuvvemi Chesavu Neram"
|Koti
|
|
|-
!Rakshakudu|"Ninne Ninne"
|A. R. Rahman
|
|Sadhana Sargam
|-
!Thambulalu|"Evari Thalaratha Evaru"
|Raj
|
|
|-
| rowspan="14" |1998
!Eshwar Allah|"Chempalaku Siggandham"
|Koti
|
|K. S. Chithra
|-
! rowspan="3" |Kanyadanam
|"Edhiprema Charithraki"
| rowspan="3" |Koti
|
|
|-
|"Kanule Vethike"
|
|
|-
|"Ekkadundhi Nyayam"
|
|
|-
!Khaidi Garu|"Devathalaara Deevinchandi"
|Koti
|
|
|-
!Pavitra Prema|"O Daivama"
|Koti
|
|
|-
! rowspan="2" |Raayudu
|"Jolali Jolali"
| rowspan="2" |S. A. Rajkumar
|
|
|-
|"Epudo Paadindhi"
|
|
|-
!Snehithulu|"Yennenni Kalalu"
|Koti
|
|
|-
!Srimathi Vellostha|"Andhamaina"
|Koti
|
|
|-
! rowspan="3" |Sri Ramulayya|"Bhoomiki Pachani"
| rowspan="3" |Vandemataram Srinivas
|Kalekuri Prasad
|
|-
|"Ghadiya Ghadiya"
|Suddala Ashok Teja
|K. S. Chithra
|-
|"Karma Bhoomilo"
|Kalekuri Prasad
|
|-
!Suryudu|"Maa Thandri Suryuda"
|Vandemataram Srinivas
|
|
|-
| rowspan="4" |1999
!Aavide Shyamala|"Omkara Roopana"
|Madhavapeddi Suresh
|
|
|-
!Hello My Dear Monisha
|"Nammodhu Nammodhu"
|T. Rajendar
|
|
|-
!Krishna Babu
|"O Manasa"
|Koti
|
|
|-
!Yamajathakudu|"Navvalamma Navvali"
|Vandemataram Srinivas
|
|
|-
| rowspan="13" |2000
!Ammo Okato Tareekhu
|"Sagatu Manishi"
|Vandemataram Srinivas
|
|
|-
!Ayodhya Ramayya|"Kolo Kokkolo"
|Vandemataram Srinivas
|
|
|-
! rowspan="2" |Chalo Assembly|"Sirigalla Bharatha Desham"
| rowspan="2" |J. V. Raghavulu
|
|
|-
|"O Bidda Naa Bidda"
|
|
|-
! rowspan="7" |Postman|"Acha Tenugula Padaranala"
| rowspan="7" |Vandemataram Srinivas
|
|Sujatha Mohan
|-
|"Nenoka Poola"(Slokam"
|
|
|-
|"Kukku Ku Kokilamma"
|
|K. S. Chithra
|-
|"Oolu Daaralatho"(Slokam)
|
|
|-
|"Ichotane"(Slokam)
|
|
|-
|"Veshamu Vesi"(Slokam)
|
|
|-
|"Rajahamsa Cheera"
|
|K. S. Chithra
|-
! rowspan="2" |Vijayaramaraju|"Maa Kosam"
| rowspan="2" |Vandemataram Srinivas
|
|Swarnalatha
|-
|"Evaru Nuvvu"
|
|
|-
|2001
!Pandanti Samsaram|"Thaalibottuleni"
|Vandemataram Srinivas
|
|K. S. Chithra
|-
| rowspan="5" |2002
!Aahuti|"Ningini Egire"
|Vandemataram Srinivas
|
|
|-
!Hrudayanjali|"Sangamam Mana Sangamam"
|L. Vaidyanathan
|
|K. S. Chithra
|-
!Kondaveeti Simhasanam|"Ashadaniki Harativa"
|Koti
|
|Sujatha Mohan
|-
!Premalo Pavani Kalyan|"Thelimanchulona"
|Ghantadi Krishna
|
|
|-
!Tappu Chesi Pappu Koodu|"Brindavanamali"
|M. M. Keeravani
|
|K. S. Chithra
|-
| rowspan="2" |2003
!Kalyana Ramudu|"Kathalo Rajakumari"
| rowspan="2" |Mani Sharma
|
|
|-
!Tarak|"Alakalu Ela"
|
|
|-
| rowspan="3" |2004
!Apparao Driving School|"Chirugaali Paata"
|Ghantadi Krishna
|
|
|-
!Suryam|"Anandham Anandham"
|Chakri
|
|
|-
!Swarabhishekam|"Anujudai Lakshmanudu"
|Vidyasagar
|
|S. P. Balasubrahmanyam
|-
| rowspan="3" |2005
!Amma Meedha Ottu|"Amma Neeku Vandhanam"
|R. Narayana Murthy
|
|
|-
!Aparichithudu|"Jiyangari Inti Sogasa"
|Harris Jayaraj
|
|
|-
!Kumkuma|"Kaalama Aade Aata"
|Ghantadi Krishna
|
|
|-
| rowspan="2" |2006
!Adavi Biddalu|"Amaasi Cheekati"
|R. Narayana Murthy
|
|
|-
!Ganga|"Ellipothunnava Thalli"
|Koti
|
|
|-
| rowspan="2" |2007
!Aadivaram Aadavallaku Selavu|"Devathavu Neevani"
|Vandemataram Srinivas
|
|
|-
!Sri Sathyanarayana Swamy|"Bhagavan Bhagavan"
|Vandemataram Srinivas
|
|
|-
| rowspan="3" |2008
!Andhariki Vandhanalu|"Yendhukayya Neekintha"
|Sai Karthik
|
|
|-
!Naa Anevaadu|"Premalo"
|Saketh Sairam
|
|
|-
!Sri Medaram Sammakka Sarakka Mahathyam|"Sathpurushunike"
|Vandemataram Srinivas
|
|
|-
| rowspan="4" |2009
!Ajantha
|"Evarikevarani Raasinodu"
|Ilaiyaraaja
|
|
|-
!Devarakonda Veerayya Koothuri Kosam|"Thodai Nuvvu Undalamma"
|Vandemataram Srinivas
|
|Kalpana Raghavendar
|-
!Mestry|"Anaganaga"
|Vandemataram Srinivas
|
|K. S. Chithra
|-
!Swamy Manikanta|"Agiripai"
|Manu Ramesh
|
|
|-
| rowspan="2" |2010
!Lava Kusa: The Warrior Twins|"Niliche Sathyam"
|L. Vaidyanathan
|
|
|-
!Veera Telangana|"Naageti Salallo"
|R. Narayana Murthy
|
|
|-
|2011
!Telugammayi|"Enninaallura"
|Vandemataram Srinivas
|
|
|-
| rowspan="3" |2012
!26 Kingston|"Idhi Chivariki"
|Padma Nabham
|
|
|-
! rowspan="2" |Mithunam
|"Aadi Dampathulu"
| rowspan="2" |Swaraveenapani
|
|
|-
|"Aata Gada Jananaalu"
|
|
|-
|2013
!Athade|"Alasina Kanulalu"(Swaram)
|Rajamani
|
|
|-
| rowspan="3" |2016
!Manalo Okadu|"Kali Kali Kalikaalam"
|R. P. Patnaik
|
|
|-
! rowspan="2" |O Malli|"O Malli Bangaru Talli"
| rowspan="2" |Krishna Sai
|
|
|-
|"Prema Mruthyuvaina"
|
|
|-
|2017
!Head Constable Venkataramayya|"Endukuraa Jeevudaa"
|Vandemataram Srinivas
|
|
|-
| rowspan="2" |2018
! rowspan="2" |Saakshyam|"Sivam Sivam"
| rowspan="2" |Harshavardhan Rameshwar
|
|
|-
|"Bhava Maaya"
|
|
|}

 Hindi 

Yesudas's first Hindi song was for the movie Jai Jawan Jai Kisan song Dilruba Kya Hua music scored by A.A. Raj, Anand Mahal (1972) but first released song was in the film Choti Si Baath, both with music scored by Salil Chowdhury, a long-standing collaborator. His most popular Hindi songs are from the 1976 movie Chitchor with music given by Ravindra Jain. The greatest tribute paid to him is cited during an interview with Ravindra Jain, wherein the blind music director confessed that if he ever happened to regain vision, the first person he would like to see was Yesudas. Yesudas's greatest association in Hindi was with Ravindra Jain and the duo combined to produce memorable including Oo Goriya re (from the film Naiyya – directed by Prashanth Nanda),Sunayna (from the film Sunayna). The film in which Yesudas sang the most memorable Hindi songs is claimed  to be Sawan Ko Aane Do with music given by the notable late Shri Raj Kamal. His most popular songs include Jaanam, Chand jaise mukhde pe and Tujhe Dekh Kar Jagwale Par (from Saawan Ko Aane Do), Kahan se aaye badra (from Chasme Baddoor), and Ni Sa Ga Ma Pa (from Anand Mahal) etc. His song Surmayee Ankhiyon Mein (from Sadma), penned by Academy Award winner lyricist Gulzar, is one of few notable and melodious song written in Lori prose.  Yesudas was also nominated for the Filmfare Award for Best Male Playback Singer thrice: for "Gori Tera Gaon" from Chitchor in 1977, for Ka Karoon Sajni Aye Na Baalam from Swami in 1978, and "Sunayana in Nazaron Ko" from Sunayana and winning the trophy for Dil Ke Tukde Tukde from Dada'' in 1980.

Hindi music directors who worked with him include Laxmikant–Pyarelal, Raamlaxman, Rajesh Roshan, Khayyam, RD Burman, Bappi Lahiri, Kalyanji-Anandji, Salil Chowdhury, Naushad, Hemant Kumar, Ravi, Ravindra Jain, Raj Kamal and Usha Khanna, SN Tripathi, Anand Milind.

Other Languages
His film songs in Bengali are major hits. Naam sokuntala taar – Srikanter Will (1979), Path haraabo boley ebaar – Protiggya (1985) and Aar bujhitey parinaa – Debikaa (1985) are his memorable songs with Salil Chowdhury.

He is also familiar to the Oriya film world. Mamataari baalijhaDa and E laakhi jaay dekhi -Batasi Jhada (1981) some hit songs.

His song "Mayechi Sauli" from Marathi film "Nanand Bhavajay" is also hit one.
His some other songs from Marathi Films are 

1) Duur Duur Jaavuya..... Film:- Mazaa Mulaga (1991)

2) Velivari Umale Kali.....Film:- Mazaa Mulaga (1991)

3) Waara Aala Bhetayala ....Film:- Nanand Bhavajay (1991)

Yesudas have also sung few Tulu language songs. One of his notable song is "Udalda Thudar gu Manas Urkaru" from the film Udalda Thudar in year 1973.

See also
 Dr. K.J.Yesudas
 Carnatic Music
 List of Carnatic singers
 Krishna Nee Begane Baaro
 K. J. Yesudas Tamil discography

References

External links
Articles

Songs
Listen Ahimsa
Listen Sitharon mein tu hi
Listen Thiruvonakkaineettam
  Khazana Selected Albums

Discography
Discographies of Indian artists